The 2012 United States presidential election in Mississippi took place on November 6, 2012, as part of the 2012 general election in which all 50 states plus the District of Columbia participated. Mississippi voters chose six electors to represent them in the Electoral College via a popular vote pitting incumbent Democratic President Barack Obama and his running mate, Vice President Joe Biden, against Republican challenger and former Massachusetts Governor Mitt Romney and his running mate, Congressman Paul Ryan.

Romney and Ryan won Mississippi with 55.29% of the popular vote to Obama and Biden's 43.79%, thus winning the state's six electoral votes by an 11.50% margin. Mississippi was one of just six states where Obama improved on his 2008 performance. According to exit polls, the black vote share in Mississippi increased from 33% in 2008 to 36% in 2012, likely explaining Obama's gains. This was the strongest showing for a Democratic presidential candidate in Mississippi since native Southerner Bill Clinton's 44.08% in 1996. Obama carried Warren County, becoming the first Democrat to do so since John F. Kennedy in 1960. He also managed to flip Benton County and improved his margins in Democratic counties throughout the state. As of the 2020 presidential election, this was the last time a Democratic presidential candidate has carried Benton, Chickasaw, and Panola counties. This is also the last time that Mississippi has voted to the left of Texas. Obama's 562,949 votes is the highest total received by a Democratic presidential candidate in the state's history.

Primaries

Democratic
Incumbent President Obama ran unopposed in the Mississippi primary and therefore received 100% of the vote.

Republican

The Republican primary took place on March 13, 2012, the same day as the Alabama Republican primary and the Hawaii Republican caucuses. After the open election, 37 bound delegates and three unbound delegates will go to the Republican National Convention.

General election

Results

By county

Counties that flipped from Republican to Democratic 
 Benton (largest town: Hickory Flat)
 Warren (largest city: Vicksburg)

By congressional district
Romney won 3 of 4 congressional districts.

See also 
Republican Party presidential debates, 2012
Republican Party presidential primaries, 2012
 Results of the 2012 Republican Party presidential primaries
 Mississippi Republican Party

References

External links
The Green Papers: for Mississippi
The Green Papers: Major state elections in chronological order

Mississippi
United States president
2012